Judith Biggert (née Borg; born August 15, 1937) is an American politician and attorney. She is a member of the Republican Party.

Biggert was defeated in her 2012 re-election bid by former US Congressman Bill Foster. She was also the last Republican woman elected to Congress from Illinois until the election of Mary Miller of the 15th congressional district in 2020.

Prior to serving in Congress, she served in the Illinois House of Representatives from 1993 to 1998. After leaving Congress, she was appointed to serve on the Illinois Education Labor Relations Board.

Early life, education and career
Biggert was born Judith Gail Borg in Chicago on August 15, 1937, the second of four children of Alvin Andrew Borg and Marjorie Virginia (Mailler) Borg. Her father worked for the Chicago-based Walgreen Co., the largest drugstore chain in the United States, for 41 years from 1928 to 1969, and served as its president from 1963 to 1969, succeeding Charles R. Walgreen Jr. and succeeded by Charles R. Walgreen III. Her paternal grandparents immigrated from Finland and her maternal family is of English descent.

She grew up in Wilmette, Illinois, a North Shore Chicago suburb, and graduated from New Trier High School in 1955, then went to Stanford University, where she received a B.A. in international relations in 1959, then worked for a year in a women's apparel store. She then attended Northwestern University School of Law where she was an editor of the Northwestern University Law Review from 1961 to 1963, earned a J.D. in 1963, then clerked for federal judge Luther Merritt Swygert of the U.S. Court of Appeals for the Seventh Circuit from 1963 to 1964.

Biggert left her federal court law clerkship to have her children, but later did some legal work from her home for family and friends on wills, trusts, and real estate. She served on numerous boards of voluntary and civic organizations.

Early community involvement and political career
Biggert was elected to the Hinsdale Township High School District 86 Board of Education in 1978 and was a board member until 1985, serving as president from 1983 to 1985. She served as chairman of the Hinsdale Plan Commission from 1989 to 1993. She also became active in Chicago community organizations, serving as chair of the Visiting Nurses Association and as president of the Junior League.

In 1992, Biggert was elected to the Illinois House of Representatives to serve the redrawn 81st District. She was re-elected in 1994 and 1996 before running for Congress in 1998.

U.S. House of Representatives

Committee assignments
 Committee on Education and the Workforce
 Subcommittee on Early Childhood, Elementary, and Secondary Education
 Subcommittee on Higher Education and Workforce Training
 Committee on Financial Services
 Subcommittee on Capital Markets, Insurance, and Government-Sponsored Enterprises
 Subcommittee on Insurance, Housing and Community Opportunity (Chairwoman)
 Committee on Science, Space and Technology
 Subcommittee on Energy and Environment
 Subcommittee on Technology and Innovation

Caucus memberships
 Co-Chair of the Caucus on Women's Issues
 Republican Main Street Partnership

Voting record

Interest group ratings

* NTLC – National Tax-Limitation Committee

Key votes

Political positions
Judy Biggert is a moderate Republican. She was a member of The Republican Main Street Partnership and Republicans for Choice.

Abortion
Biggert supports abortion rights. She supports embryonic stem-cell research. She was given a 50% rating from NARAL Pro-Choice America and a 67% rating from Planned Parenthood, which both support legal abortion, a 100% rating from Population Connection, an anti-abortion organization which supports voluntary family planning, and a 50% rating from the anti-abortion National Right to Life Committee which opposes access to legal abortion.

Taxes
Biggert was one of 171 of the 178 Republican U.S. House members in the 111th Congress to have signed Grover Norquist's Americans for Tax Reform Taxpayer Protection Pledge:

Biggert supported making all of the Bush tax cuts permanent, regardless of income.

Social security, healthcare, and Medicaid
Biggert supported the partial privatization of Social Security, in which individuals could choose to voluntarily divert 2% of their Social Security tax payments from paying Social Security beneficiaries into individual private accounts which they could invest in the stock market and which they could pass on to their heirs.

Biggert supported the repeal (or defunding to prevent implementation) of the 2010 Democratic health care reform and its replacement with Republican health care reform.

Biggert opposed allowing individuals less than 65 years of age to buy into Medicare.

Illegal immigration
Biggert opposed any comprehensive immigration reform that provides a path to citizenship for illegal immigrants and supports efforts against illegal immigration. .

Campaign finance
Biggert opposed public financing of federal election campaigns, and supported the elimination of all limits on campaign contributions with immediate and full disclosure of contributions.

Same-sex marriage and LGBT issues
Biggert voted against the 2006 Federal Marriage Amendment, a proposed constitutional amendment intended to ban gay marriage. She supported repealing the "Don't Ask, Don't Tell" policy, but opposed repealing the Defense of Marriage Act which prohibited federal recognition of same-sex marriages. In 2012, she was given a 70% rating from the Human Rights Campaign, a political action committee which supports same-sex marriage and other gay rights, and she was given a 100% rating by PFLAG, or Parents, Families, and Friends of Lesbians and Gays.

Political campaigns

1998

In 1998, Biggert narrowly defeated conservative state Senator Peter Roskam in the Republican primary, the real contest in this ancestrally Republican district. Biggert earned 61% of the vote to win the seat opened up by the retirement of U. S. Representative Harris Fawell.  In 2006, Roskam was elected to Congress from another district.

2006

In 2006, Biggert's share of the vote in the general election fell below 60% for the first time in her Congressional career.

2008

In 2008, Biggert received less than 54% of the vote overall (and less than 50% of the vote in Will County) in winning reelection to her sixth term in Congress in her first general election campaign against a financially competitive opponent, businessman Scott Harper. In 2008, Democratic U.S. Sen. Dick Durbin was reelected with 60% of the vote and Democrat Barack Obama won 54% of the vote in the 13th Congressional District, with even Biggert's Republican predecessor, Fawell, supporting Obama.

2010

Biggert won re-election.

2012

In the redistricting following the 2010 census, the Democratic-controlled state legislature significantly altered Illinois's congressional map, splitting Biggert's district. Her district was renumbered as the 11th District, and made significantly more Democratic even though it contains 50 percent of Biggert's former territory.  A portion of her former district that included Biggert's home in Hinsdale was combined with the heavily Democratic Chicago North Side-based 5th District.  Biggert opted to run in the new 11th against the Democratic nominee, former 14th District Congressman Bill Foster.

Electoral history

Illinois House, 81st Representative District (1992–1996)
 1992 Republican primary
 Judy Biggert – 5,284  (38%)
 James P. McCarthy – 3,498  (25%)
 Todd Vandermyde – 1,861  (13%)
 Andrew J. (Andy) Clark – 1,758  (12%)
 John Curry – 1,684  (12%)
 1992 general election
 Judy Biggert (R) – 28,655  (69%)
 David M. Briggs (D) – 12,918  (31%)
 1994 Republican primary
 Judy Biggert – 6,100  (54%)
 James P. McCarthy – 5,219  (46%)
 1994 general election
 Judy Biggert (R) – 22,227  (78.51%)
 Bill Chalberg (D) – 6,085  (21%)
 1996 Republican primary
 Judy Biggert – 14,142  (100%)
 1996 general election
 Judy Biggert (R) – 28,597  (71%)
 Dave Brockway (D) – 11,573  (29%)

U.S. House, Illinois 13th Congressional District (1998– )
 1998 Republican primary
 Judy Biggert – 24,482  (45%)
 Peter Roskam – 21,784  (40%)
 David J. Shestokas – 2,574  (5%)
 Michael J. Krzyston – 2,566  (5%)
 Andrew J. Clark – 1,926  (4%)
 Walter Marksym – 1,035  (2%)
 1998 general election
 Judy Biggert (R) – 121,889  (61%)  $1,294,853*
 Susan W. Hynes (D) – 77,878  (39%)  $222,656*
 2000 Republican primary
 Judy Biggert – 39,121  (100%)
 2000 general election
 Judy Biggert (R) – 193,250  (66%)  $381,623*
 Thomas Mason (D) – 98,768  (34%)
 2002 Republican primary
 Judy Biggert – 70,691  (100%)
 2002 general election
 Judy Biggert (R) – 139,456  (70%)  $464,054*
 Tom Mason (D) – 59,069  (30%)
 2004 Republican primary
 Judy Biggert – 46,861  (>99%)
 Bob Hart (write-in) – 231  (<1%)
 2004 general election
 Judy Biggert (R) – 200,472  (65%)             $542,733*
 Gloria Schor Andersen (D) – 107,836  (35%)  $42,129*
 Mark Alan Mastrogiovanni (write-in) – 4  (0%)
 2006 Republican primary
 Judy Biggert – 52,900  (80%)
 Bob Hart – 13,564  (20%)
 2006 general election
 Judy Biggert (R) – 119,720  (58%)  $1,014,819*
 Joseph Shannon (D) – 85,507  (42%)   $225,842*
 Mark Alan Mastrogiovanni (write-in) – 7  (0%)
 2008 Republican primary
 Judy Biggert – 58,533  (77%)
 Sean O'Kane – 17,206  (23%)
 2008 general election
 Judy Biggert (R) – 180,888  (54%)  $1,585,536*
 Scott Harper (D) – 147,430  (44%)    $1,070,201*
 Steve Alesch (Green) – 9,402  (3%)
 Theodore Knapp (write-in) – 51  (0%)
 2010 Republican primary
 Judy Biggert – 58,294  (100%)
 2010 general election
 Judy Biggert (R) –       $1,450,000**
 Scott Harper (D) –            $621,000**
*  campaign expenditures
** campaign contributions (through September 30, 2010)

Post-congressional career
On April 23, 2015, Illinois Governor Bruce Rauner appointed Biggert to the Education Labor Relations Board, which oversees the negotiation of teacher contracts.

Personal life
On September 21, 1963, she married Rody Patterson Biggert, Jr.  Rody and Judy Biggert lived in Chicago, then Wilmette, before moving to Hinsdale in 1971, when Rody's mother sold them her home, the extensively remodeled 1864 mansion of Hinsdale's founder, William Robbins, in the Robbins Park Historic District. The Biggerts have four children: Courtney Caverly, Alison Cabot, Rody Biggert, and Adrienne Morrell, and nine grandchildren. Her husband, Rody, died in November 2018 after an 18-month long struggle with leukemia at the age of 82.

Since 2004, Biggert's youngest daughter Adrienne Morrell has been a registered lobbyist for Health Net, the sixth largest publicly traded for-profit managed healthcare company; previously Morrell was a lobbyist with America's Health Insurance Plans (AHIP), the chief health insurance industry lobby, after having served as an aide to former seven-term Illinois 13th District U.S. Rep. Harris Fawell, Biggert's predecessor in Congress.

In 2008, multimillionaire Biggert was the second wealthiest—after U.S. Rep. Bill Foster (D-14)—in Illinois's 21-member Congressional delegation, and the 82nd wealthiest member in the U.S. House.

Biggert was president of the Junior Board of the Chicago Travelers Aid Society in 1969, and president of the Junior League of Chicago from 1976 to 1978, chairman of board of directors of the Visiting Nurse Association of Chicago in 1978, and president of the Oak School elementary school PTA in Hinsdale from 1976 to 1978. She was a member of the board of directors of the Salt Creek Ballet from 1990 to 1998. She was also a Sunday school teacher at Grace Episcopal Church in Hinsdale from 1974 to 1984, and an American Youth Soccer Organization assistant soccer coach in 1983.

See also
 Women in the United States House of Representatives

References

External links

 Judy Biggert for Congress official campaign site
 
 
 2012 candidate questionnaire and video  at ABC 7 Chicago
 Biggert, Foster square off in 11th Dist. debate, ABC 7 Chicago, October 13, 2012, complete video

|-

|-

|-

1937 births
21st-century American politicians
21st-century American women politicians
American Episcopalians
American people of English descent
American people of Finnish descent
American women lawyers
Female members of the United States House of Representatives
Illinois lawyers
Living people
Republican Party members of the Illinois House of Representatives
New Trier High School alumni
Northwestern University Pritzker School of Law alumni
Politicians from Chicago
People from Hinsdale, Illinois
Republican Party members of the United States House of Representatives from Illinois
School board members in Illinois
Stanford University alumni
United States congressional aides
Women state legislators in Illinois